The Marin-Bolinas Botanical Gardens (14 acres) are botanical gardens specializing in succulents, located in Bolinas, California, United States. They are not open to the public as of 2018.
The gardens were created by Dr. Herman Schwartz, a retired physician. They now contain over 2,000 species; the children's garden has 280 types of succulents. The gardens include six greenhouses, including ones dedicated to aloes and euphorbias. A Marin County native flower garden (6.5 acres) is currently being added.

See also 
 List of botanical gardens in the United States

References

External links 
California Horticulture Society Bulletin (October 2001): "Marin-Bolinas Botanical Gardens"

Botanical gardens in California
Bolinas, California
Parks in Marin County, California